Caladenia peisleyi is a plant in the orchid family Orchidaceae and is endemic to south-eastern Australia. It is a ground orchid with a single leaf and a single greenish-yellow flower with pale red stripes. It is difficult to distinguish from several other Caladenia species.

Description
The sepals and petals taper to thin, thread-like tips. Flowering occurs in September and October. This caladenia is similar to and difficult to distinguish from C. oreophila, C. montana, C. osmera, C. australis and C. fitzgeraldii which occur in similar areas.

Taxonomy and naming
This orchid was first formally described in 2006 by David Jones and given the name Arachnorchis peisleyi. The description was published in Australian Orchid Research. In 2007 Gary Backhouse changed the name to Caladenia peisleyi. The specific epithet (peisleyi) honours Allan Bertrand Peisley, an Australian orchidologist.

Distribution and habitat
Caladenia peisleyi is only known from East Gippsland where it grows in heath and heathy forest. It probably also occurs on the south coast of New South Wales.

Conservation
Caladenia peisleyi  is listed as  "vulnerable" under the Victorian Flora and Fauna Guarantee Act 1988.

References 

peisleyi
Plants described in 2006
Endemic orchids of Australia
Orchids of Victoria (Australia)
Taxa named by David L. Jones (botanist)